Jazan, also spelled Jizan, Gizan or Gazan, is a port city and the capital of Jizan Region, which lies in the southwest corner of Saudi Arabia. Jazan City is situated on the coast of the Red Sea and serves a large agricultural heartland that has a population of 319,119 as of 2021 and over 1.5 million, within metropolitan area. As the city is the capital of the region, it has the regional airport as well as Jazan seaport. The area is noted for its high-quality production of tropical fruits like mango, figs, and papaya.

Jazan has one of the largest mega projects market in the kingdom with significant infrastructure projects worth many billions of dollars. Saudi Aramco is building a 400,000 bpd refinery with associated terminal facilities on the Red Sea near Jazan, scheduled for completion in late 2018.

Ethnography
The inhabitants of Jazan are Arab and split between Sunni Muslims and Shia Muslims that live in the Jazan region.

Economy
In the early 20th century, Jazan was a major site for pearl fishing. When World War I began, trade declined at Jazan, moving to Al Hudaydah.

Today, ambitious projects in transport, renewable energy, tourism and agricultural development are taking place in Jizan region, particularly in Jazan Economic City, including a US$3 Billion aluminium smelter.

Jazan is being turned into Saudi Arabia's naval industry hub. Furthermore, the southern and western outskirts of the city are a place which the Kingdom wants to turn into its agricultural hub due to the water underground as well as the rich and diverse soil.

Jazan Refinery 
Jazan Refinery is a megaproject under construction and owned by Saudi Aramco. The Refinery will process heavy and medium crude oil to create liquefied petroleum gas, sulfur, asphalt, benzene, and paraxylene. It is expected to produce 400,000 barrels per day.

Transport
Jazan Port and Jazan Regional Airport serve the city of Jazan.

Climate
Jazan has a hot desert climate (Köppen: BSh) with a rainfall below 200 mm per year and an average annual temperature above .
It is very humid but parched in some months, making the weather volatile. Sandstorms are quite common in areas further from the sea.

See also
Jazan Economic City
List of cities and towns in Saudi Arabia
Samtah

References

External links

Official site

Populated places in Jizan Province
Port cities and towns in Saudi Arabia
Populated coastal places in Saudi Arabia
Provincial capitals of Saudi Arabia
Port cities and towns of the Red Sea